Sonbong County, formerly called Unggi (Chosŏn'gŭl: 웅기, Hancha: 雄基), is a subdivision of the North Korean city of Rason. It is located at the northeastern extreme of North Korea, bordering Russia and China. It lies on Unggi Bay, an extension of the Sea of Japan (East Sea of Korea). A uranium mine is allegedly located there, as is a 200 megawatt oil-fired power plant. The word Sonbong means "Vanguard" in Korean.

The Sonbong Revolutionary Site there is dedicated to a visit by Kim Jong-suk in November 1945 "upholding the policy of building a new country advanced by President Kim Il Sung" after the liberation of Korea. It includes the Sonbong Revolutionary Museum, a monument to the historic site, and the house where she stayed.

Administrative divisions
Sonbong County is divided into 1 town ("Ŭp"), 2 worker's districts ("Rodongjagu") and 10 villages ("Ri"):

 Sŏnbong-ŭp (선봉읍/先鋒邑)
 Tuman'gang-rodongjagu (두만강로동자구/豆滿江勞動者區)
 Ungsang-rodongjagu (웅상로동자구/雄尙勞動者區)
 Chosal-li (조산리/造山里)
 Hahoe-ri (하회리/下檜里)
 Hayŏp'yŏng-ri (하여평리/下汝坪里)
 Hongŭi-ri (홍의리/洪儀里)
 Kulp'o-ri (굴포리/屈浦里)
 Paekhang-ri (백학리/白鶴里)
 Pup'o-ri (부포리/鮒浦里)
 Sahoe-ri (사회리/四會里)
 Uam-ri (우암리/牛岩里)
 Wŏnjŏng-ri (원정리/元汀里)

Climate 

Sonbong has a humid continental climate (Dfb) with mild to warm, rainy summers and cold, long winters. Seasons are somewhat moderated by the presence of the Sea of Japan.

Transportation
Sonbong is North Korea's rail link to Russia. A rail bridge crosses the Tumen River between the border rail stations of Tumangang Workers' District, Sonbong, and Khasan, Russia. This connection lies on one of two proposed paths for linking South Korea by rail to the Trans-Siberian Railroad and the rest of Eurasia, the other being through Sinuiju. The rail link through Sonbong is lightly used, carrying only 10,000 passengers in 2005.

Sonbong is one terminus of the Hambuk Line railroad. It is also served by roads.

There is a seaport and a wharf at Sonbong Port.

See also
List of cities in North Korea
Geography of North Korea

References

External links
Tumen River Area Development Program profile of the area

Counties of North Korea
Uranium mines
Mining in North Korea
Rason